The following is a list of notable deaths in December 1994.

Entries for each day are listed alphabetically by surname. A typical entry lists information in the following sequence:
 Name, age, country of citizenship at birth, subsequent country of citizenship (if applicable), reason for notability, cause of death (if known), and reference.

December 1994

1
Samia Gamal, 70, Egyptian belly dancer and actress.
Reg Garvin, 82, Australian rules football player.
William S. Hanna, 71, American politician.
Helen McCloy, 90, American writer.
Calvin Mooers, 75, American computer scientist.

2
Bogumił Andrzejewski, 72, Polish writer and linguist.
Julien Davies Cornell, 84, American lawyer who defended pacifist Ezra Pound.
Miguel M. Delgado, 88, Mexican film director and screenwriter, cancer.
Orhan Şaik Gökyay, 92, Turkish author.
Alan Splet, 54, American sound designer and sound editor (Eraserhead, Dune, Blue Velvet).
Reginald Claude Sprigg, 75, Australian geologist and conservationist.

3
Giorgi Chanturia, 35, Georgian politician and the National Democratic Party leader, homicide.
John E. Henderson, 77, American politician of the Republican Party.
Earl Johnson, 75, American baseball player and scout and World War II veteran.
Mihail Lozanov, 83, Bulgarian football player.

4
Reaves H. Baysinger, 92, American gridiron football player and coach.
Geoffrey Elton, 73, German-British political and constitutional historian, heart attack.
Ichiro Ogimura, 62, Japanese table tennis player and coach, lung cancer.
Julio Ramón Ribeyro, 65, Peruvian writer.
Gertrud Schiller, 89, German writer.
István Timár, 54, Hungarian canoe racer.

5
Asım Orhan Barut, 68, Turkish-American theoretical physicist.
Harry Horner, 84, American art director (The Hustler, The Heiress, They Shoot Horses, Don't They?), Oscar winner (1950, 1962), pneumonia.
Günter Meisner, 68, German actor (Willy Wonka & the Chocolate Factory, The Boys from Brazil, The Winds of War).
Saïd Mohammedi, 81, Algerian politician.
Rudy Pilous, 80, Canadian ice hockey player and coach.
Dick Rifenburg, 68, American gridiron football player and sports broadcaster.
E.W. Swackhamer, 67, American television and film director.

6
Heinz Baas, 72, German football player and manager.
Máire de Paor, 69, Irish historian and archaeologist.
Otar Gordeli, 66, Georgian musician.
Richard Markowitz, 68, American film and television composer (Murder, She Wrote, The Wild Wild West, Police Story).
Alun Owen, 69, British screenwriter.
Gian Maria Volonté, 61, Italian actor, heart attack.

7
Elga Andersen, 59, German actress and singer, cancer.
Pierre Cloarec, 85, French road bicycle racer.
Franz Lucas, 83, German SS officer and Auschwitz concentration camp doctor during World War II.
Edward Rell Madigan, 58, American politician, lung cancer.
J. C. Tremblay, 55, Canadian ice hockey player, kidney cancer.

8
Antônio Carlos Jobim, 67, Brazilian musician, heart failure.
Semni Karusou, 96, Greek archaeologist and art historian.
Enrique Líster, 87, Spanish communist politician and military officer.
Crawford Nalder, 84, Australian politician.

9
Antal Apró, 81, Hungarian politician.
John Joe Barry, 69, Irish middle-distance runner and  Olympian.
Max Bill, 85, Swiss architect, painter and sculptor, heart attack.
O. C. Fisher, 91, American politician.
Pat Haggerty, 67, American football official in the National Football League, cancer.
Garnett Silk, 28, Jamaican reggae musician and Rastafarian, domestic accident.
Alex Wilson, 87, Canadian sprinter.

10
Henry Bernard, 82, French architect and urban planner.
Friedel Dzubas, 79, German-American abstract painter.
Keith Joseph, 76, British barrister and politician.
Jiří Marek, 80, Czech publicist, scriptwriter, and writer.

11
Magnus Andersen, 78, Norwegian politician.
Dionísio Azevedo, 72, Brazilian actor and director, lung cancer.
Edward A. Craig, 98,  United States Marine Corps officer.
Vera Kuznetsova, 87, Soviet/Russian actress.
Stanisław Maczek, 102, Polish military officer of World War I and World War II.
Carl Marzani, 82, American spy.
George Phillips, 73, American gridiron football player.
Philip Phillips, 94, American archaeologist.
Yuli Raizman, 90, Soviet/Russian film director, screenwriter.
Kenneth Rush, 84, American diplomat and ambassador.
Avet Terterian, 65, Soviet/Armenian composer.
Yao Yilin, 77, Chinese politician and Vice Premier.

12
John Edgar Colwell Hearne, 68, Jamaican writer.
Jabra Ibrahim Jabra, 75, Palestinian translator.
Nicolaas Kuiper, 74, Dutch mathematician.
Annelise Reenberg, 75, Danish film director.
Stuart Roosa, 61, American astronaut, pancreatic cancer.
Sir Evelyn Shuckburgh, 85, British diplomat.
Donna J. Stone, 61, American poet and philanthropist.
Frederick Turnovsky, 77, New Zealand businessman and arts advocate.

13
Glenn M. Anderson, 81, American politician.
Norman Beaton, 60, British actor, heart attack.
Philip S. Foner, 83, American historian.
Philip Hauser, 85, American academic.
Antoine Pinay, 102, French politician and Prime Minister of France.
Charlie Richard, 53, American football coach.
Olga Rubtsova, 85, Soviet/Russian chess player.

14
Orval Faubus, 84, American politician and governor of Arkansas, prostate cancer.
Edmund Hudleston, 85, British Royal Air Force air marshal.
Mary Ann McCall, 75, American pop and jazz singer.
Robert Mersey, 77, American musician, arranger and record producer.
Catherine Filene Shouse, 98, American researcher and philanthropist.
Franco Venturi, 80, Italian historian, essayist and journalist.

15
Oscar Bidegain, 89, Argentine politician.
Boris Chichibabin, 71, Soviet/Russian writer.
Arthur de la Mare, 80, British diplomat and High Commissioner of Singapore.
Piero Gardoni, 60, Italian professional footballer.
Mollie Phillips, 87, British skater.
Hazel Brannon Smith, 80, American journalist, publisher and Pullitzer Prize winner.
Harry Tobias, 99, American lyricist.

16
Patrick Cobbold, 60, British football executive.
David Dunlap, 84, American rower.
Mary Durack, 81, Australian novelist and historian.
Les Gandar, 75, New Zealand politician.

17
Pierre Baruzy, 97, French boxing champion and manager.
Deon Dreyer, 20, South African recreational scuba diver, drowned.
Hambardzum Galstyan, 39, Armenian politician and historian, homicide.
Ella Hval, 90, Norwegian actress.
Stefano Sertorelli, 82, Italian soldier, skier and Olympian.
Olavi Talja, 69, Finnish sprinter, middle-distance runner and Olympian.
Ajahn Thate, 92, Thai meditation master and buddhist monk.

18
Roger Apéry, 78, Greek-French mathematician, Parkinson's disease.
Henry Banks, 81, American racecar driver.
Phil Bengtson, 81, American gridiron football player and coach.
Heinz Bernard, 70, British actor, director and theatre manager.
Don Fedderson, 81, American television executive.
David Pitt, Baron Pitt of Hampstead, 81, British politician.
Peter Hebblethwaite, 64, British priest, journalist, and biographer.
F. Bradford Morse, 73, American politician.
Lilia Skala, 98, Austrian-American actress (Lilies of the Field, Flashdance, Charly).
Suryakantam, 70, Indian actress.

19
Vera Chaplina, 86, Soviet/Russian children's writer and naturalist.
Bill Douglass, 71, American jazz drummer.
Vadim Kozin, 91, Russian tenor and songwriter.
Noel Pointer, 39, American musician, stroke.
K. A. P. Viswanatham, 95, Indian politician.

20
Eva Alexanderson, 83, Swedish translator and writer.
Daniel I. Arnon, 84, Polish-American plant physiologist, heart failure.
Stephen Coughlan, 83, Irish politician.
Alexander Felszeghy, 61, Czechoslovak association football player and coach.
Valeriy Kryvov, 43, Soviet/Ukrainian volleyball player.
Cyril Ponnamperuma, 71, Sri Lankan scientist.
Phelim O'Neill, 2nd Baron Rathcavan, 85, British politician.
Dean Rusk, 85, American politician and Secretary of State, heart failure.
Bob Wellman, 69, American baseball player, manager and scout.

21
Göte Almqvist, 73, Swedish ice hockey player.
Butch Hartman, 54, American stock car racing driver, heart attack.
Mabel Poulton, 93, English actress.
Audrey Sale-Barker, 91, British aviator and alpine skier.
Koreya Senda, 90, Japanese stage director and translator, and actor.

22
Gérard Loiselle, 73, Canadian politician.
Nobuko Otowa, 70, Japanese actress, liver cancer.
Atte Pakkanen, 82, Finnish politician.
J. A. Todd, 86, English mathematician.

23
Tony Doyle, 41, Australian politician, AIDS-related complications.
Mark Foo, 36, Singapore-American surfer, surfing accident.
Johnny Mince, 82, American swing jazz clarinetist.
Sebastian Shaw, 89, English actor (Return of the Jedi) and author.
Charles Wesley Shilling, 93, American physician and navy officer.
Teiji Ōmiya, 66, Japanese voice actor, colorectal cancer.

24
John Boswell, 47, American historian and professor, AIDS-related complications.
Rossano Brazzi, 78, Italian actor.
Maurice Chéhab, 89, Lebanese archaeologist and museum curator.
John T. Dugan, 74, American screenwriter.
Julie Haydon, 84, American actress, cancer.
Elisabeth Neumann-Viertel, 94, Austrian actress.
John Osborne, 65, English playwright (Look Back in Anger and actor (Get Carter), diabetes.
Aleksandr Uvarov, 72, Russian ice hockey player.
Eduardo Orrego Villacorta, 61, Peruvian politician and architect, cancer.

25
Ghulam Ahmed Chishti, 89, Pakistani film score composer, heart attack.
Pierre Dreyfus, 87, French businessman and civil servant.
Cyril Garnham, 93, British parasitologist.
Masjkur, 89, Indonesian politician.
Zail Singh, 78, Indian politician and former President of India, traffic collision.
Czesław Spychała, 77, Polish tennis player.

26
Robert Emhardt, 80, American actor (3:10 to Yuma).
Jock Campbell, Baron Campbell of Eskan, 82, British businessman and peer.
Sylva Koscina, 61, Yugoslav/Croatian actress (Hercules, Judex, The Secret War of Harry Frigg), breast cancer.
Kothuku Nanappan, 59, Malayalam film actor.
Dennis Osadebay, 83, Nigerian politician, poet, and journalist.
Pietro Pavan, 91, Italian Catholic cardinal.
Allie Reynolds, 77, American baseball player.
Germaine Rouer, 97, French actress.
Karl Schiller, 83, German scientist and politician.
Parveen Shakir, 42, Pakistani writer and poet, traffic collision.
Seetharaman Sundaram, 93, Indian lawyer and yoga as exercise pioneer .

27
Winsome Fanny Barker, 87, South African botanist and plant collector.
Fanny Cradock, 85, English restaurant critic, television chef and writer.
Marjorie Joyner, 98, American businesswoman, philanthropist, and activist.
Peter May, 64, English cricket player and administrator, brain cancer.
Steve Plytas, 81, British actor.
Haki Toska, 74, Albanian politician.

28
Ursula Appolloni, 65, Canadian politician, lung cancer.
Georgy Baydukov, 87, Soviet/Russian aircraft test pilot and writer.
Victor FitzGeorge-Balfour, 81, British Army officer.
Joseph Holland, 84, American stage actor.
Gopalaswamy Mahendraraja, 38, Sri Lankan member of Liberation Tigers of Tamil Eelam, executed.
Arnljot Norwich, 71, Norwegian politician.

29
Robert Barbour, 95, Australian cricket player.
Bernard Cousino, 92, American inventor.
Manuel Mora, 85, Costa Rican politician.
Frank Thring, 68, Australian actor (Ben-Hur, King of Kings, Mad Max Beyond Thunderdome) and theatre director, cancer.

30
Geoff Bradford, 67, English football player.
Dmitri Ivanenko, 90, Soviet/Russian physicist.
Andrei Kuznetsov, 28, Soviet/Russian volleyball player, traffic collision.
Hap Moran, 93, American gridiron football player.
Anton Rom, 85, German rower.
Maureen Starkey Tigrett, 48, British hairdresser and wife of beatle Ringo starr, leukemia.
Xu Yixin, 83, Chinese politician.

31
Leigh Bowery, 33, Australian performance artist, club promoter, and fashion designer, AIDS-related complications.
Jacques Dimont, 49, French fencer and Olympic champion.
Leo Fuchs, 83, Polish-American actor and coupletist.
Elma Karlowa, 62, Yugoslav/Croatian actress, diabetes.
Bruno Pezzey, 39, Austrian football player, cardioplegia.
Woody Strode, 80, American athlete and actor (Spartacus, The Ten Commandments, Once Upon a Time in the West), lung cancer.
Harri Webb, 74, Welsh poet, journalist and librarian, stroke.

References 

1994-12
 12